The chestnut-sided warbler (Setophaga pensylvanica) is a New World warbler. They breed in eastern North America and in southern Canada westwards to the Canadian Prairies. They also breed in the Great Lakes region and in the eastern United States.

Etymology

Migration range
These birds are migratory, wintering in Central America south to northern Colombia, with a confirmed sighting from as far south as Ecuador; they are also very rare vagrants to western Europe. They arrive in their breeding range in May and depart by mid-September.

Description

This species is a moderately-sized New World warbler. Despite having very different plumage, it is thought to be closely related to the widespread yellow warbler.

In the summer, male chestnut-sided warblers are unmistakable in appearance. They display dark-streaked gray backs, white faces, black eyestripes and yellow crowns. Their underparts are white, with chestnut flanks, and they also have two white wing bars. The adult females resemble washed-out versions of the summer male, and in particular, the females lack the strong head pattern, and also have little to no chestnut coloring on their flanks.

Non-breeding birds of both sexes have bright yellow-green crowns, white eye-rings on a grey face, and unstreaked underparts. They also have unstreaked pale grey breasts. Their wing bars are always present in their plumages. Their lack of streaking and yellowish backs help to distinguish this species from the larger blackpoll warbler in the fall.

Sound

The songs are high whistled lines often described as pleased, pleased, pleased to MEECHA. This accented song is used primarily to attract a female and decrease in frequency once nesting is well under way. Males also sing unaccented songs (without the MEECHA at the end) and these are used mostly in territory defense and aggressive encounters with other males. Some males sing only unaccented songs, and they are less successful at securing mates than males that sing both songs. Their calls are harsh chips. Despite the fact that songs for courtship do not vary across small distances, songs for aggression are highly localized, a possible explanation being that female Chestnut-Sided Warblers disperse over long distances.

Breeding and habitat

The chestnut-sided warbler has benefited from the clearing of mature forests. They make use of the abundant second growth habitats. In the tropics where they winter however, the species occurs mostly in mature tropical rainforests. Their cup-shaped nests are placed in a low bush, which is usually located in young deciduous woodland or scrub. These birds lay 3–5 eggs that are creamy white or greenish with brown speckles in color. The nest is a small cup woven of bark strips, weed stems, grasses, and plant down. This species is frequently parasitized by brown-headed cowbirds.

Population

This bird's numbers have increased as second growth forest became more common in the east in the late 19th century; their numbers have declined slightly since then.

Food

Chestnut-sided warblers are primarily insectivorous. They forage actively in shrubs and small trees, and sometimes will attempt to catch insects in mid-air. Most foraging consists of gleaning insects from foliage. They will include berries in their winter diets, such as those of Cymbopetalum mayanum; such trees can be used to attract wintering birds into gardens and parks.

References

External links

 
 Chestnut-sided warbler - Dendroica Pensylvanica - USGS Patuxent Bird Identification InfoCenter
 Chestnut-sided warbler species account - Cornell Lab of Ornithology
 
 Chestnut-sided warbler at Animal Diversity Web

chestnut-sided warbler
Native birds of the Canadian Prairies
Native birds of Eastern Canada
Native birds of the Northeastern United States
Birds of Appalachia (United States)
chestnut-sided warbler
Taxa named by Carl Linnaeus